Pleuromeia is an extinct genus of lycophytes related modern quillworts (Isoetes). Pleuromeia dominated vegetation during the Early Triassic all over Eurasia and elsewhere, in the aftermath of Permian–Triassic extinction event. During this period it often occurred in monospecific assemblages. Its sedimentary context in monospecific assemblages on immature paleosols, is evidence that it was an opportunistic pioneer plant that grew on mineral soils with little competition. It spread to high latitudes with greenhouse climatic conditions. Conifers reoccurred in the Early Anisian, followed by the cycads and pteridosperms during the Late Anisian.

Description 
Around the stem were helically arranged leaves. It had a 2-4 lobed bulbous base to which numerous adventive roots are attached. Pleuromeia produced a single heterosporus large cone (strobilus) at the tip of the stem or in some species many smaller cones. The top of the cone carries microsporophylls, the lower part megasporophylls, and both types may intercallated midlength. Sporophylls are disposed from the bottom up. Both types are obovate, with a round to ovoid sporangium and a tongue-like extension nearer to the tip on the upper/inner side. The trilete microspores are hollow, round and 30–40 μm in diameter. Megaspores have a layered outer skin with a small trilete mark, are also hollow, round to ovoid and up to 300–400 μm in diameter. The megaspores and microspores are assigned to Trileites and Densoisporites respectively.

Ecology 
Dense populations of Pleuromeia hardly allowing for other species, are recorded around the world from habitats ranging from semi-arid to tidal. Analysis suggest that they were perennial plants with relatively slow growth rates. However it is likely that they were also capable of rapid growth prior to reproduction.

Taxonomy 
It has been suggested that Sadovnikovia (Kungurian) is the common ancestor of both the Isoetaceae and the Pleuromeiaceae. The earliest species of the extant genus Isoetes is known from the Lower Triassic, its extinct sister genus Annalepis occurs later during the Triassic. The Pleuromeiaceae seems to be represented by the subsequent development of the genera Viatcheslavia (Roadian), Signacularia (Wordian), Pleuromeia (Induan to Anisian) and Ferganodendron (Ladinian–Carnian) from each other.

History of discovery 
When the Cathedral of Magdeburg was under repair during the 1830s, a block of sandstone crashed and split open, revealing a fragment of the stem of Pleuromeia sternbergi. This was described by George Graf zu Munster in 1839 as a species of Sigillaria. Corda later assigned the species to the new genus Pleuromeya. The sandstone had been mined in a quarry near Bernburg (Saale) where later on numerous specimens of Pleuromeia were found, including cones. P. sternbergi has since been found in other Lower and Middle Buntsandstein deposits elsewhere in Germany, France and Spain. Other species have been described from several localities in Russia, Australia, South America and Japan.

References

External links
Information and image

Prehistoric lycophytes
Triassic plants
Fossil taxa described in 1852
Anisian life
Induan genus first appearances
Anisian genus extinctions
Prehistoric lycophyte genera